Vienna is the capital and a federal state of Austria.

Vienna may also refer to:

Geography 
 Vienna, Hunters Hill, a cottage in Hunters Hill, a suburb of Sydney, Australia
 the River Vienna, a small river meeting the Danube at Vienna; see Wien River, Austria
 Vienna, Ontario, Canada
 Vienne, Isère, France, known in Roman times as Vienna

United States
 Vienna, Alabama, an unincorporated community
 Vienna, Georgia, a census-designated place (CDP)

 Vienna, Illinois, a city
 Vienna, Indiana, a township
 The Vienna, a building in Indianapolis, Indiana, listed on the National Register of Historic Places
 Vienna, Louisiana, a town
 Vienna, Maine, a town
 Vienna, Maryland, a town
 Vienna, Michigan, an unincorporated community
 Vienna Township, Genesee County, Michigan, a township
 Vienna Township, Montmorency County, Michigan, a township
 Vienna Township, Rock County, Minnesota, a township
 Vienna, Missouri, a town
 Vienna, New York, a town and hamlet
 Vienna, North Carolina, a small unincorporated community
 Vienna, Ohio, a census-designated place (CDP) and township
 Vienna, South Dakota, a town
 Vienna, Virginia, a town
 Vienna, West Virginia, a town
 Vienna, Wisconsin, a town

Music
 Vienna (album), an album by Ultravox
 "Vienna" (Ultravox song), a song by Ultravox
 "Vienna" (Billy Joel song), from The Stranger (1977)
 "Vienna", a song by Trans-Siberian Orchestra from Beethoven's Last Night
 "Vienna", a song by The Fray on the Movement EP
 Vienna horn,  a musical instrument

Games 
 Vienna coup, a play technique in contract bridge
 Vienna Game, a chess opening
 Vienna System, a bidding system in contract bridge

Treaties, conventions and diplomatic conferences
 Treaty of Vienna (1738)
 Vienna Convention (disambiguation)
 Congress of Vienna (1814–1815)
 Vienna Convention on Diplomatic Relations (1961)
 Vienna Convention on Civil Liability for Nuclear Damage (1963)
 Vienna Convention on Consular Relations (1963)
 Vienna Convention on Road Traffic (1968)
 Vienna Convention on the Law of Treaties (1969)
 U.N. Convention on Contracts for the International Sale of Goods (1980)
 Vienna Convention for the Protection of the Ozone Layer (1985)
 Vienna Convention on the Law of Treaties between States and International Organizations or Between International Organizations (1986)
 Vienna Document of the Organization for Security and Co-Operation in Europe for confidence and security building measures
 United Nations Convention Against Illicit Traffic in Narcotic Drugs and Psychotropic Substances (1988)
 First Vienna Award (1939), an arbitral decision rewarding disputed territory to Hungary
 Second Vienna Award (1940), an arbitral decision rewarding disputed territory to Hungary

Other uses
 Vienna (audio drama series), based on the TV series Doctor Who
 Vienna (comics), a fictional character in Marvel Comics' Marvel Universe
 Vienna (film), a 1968 short film by Orson Welles
 Vienna Beef, a manufacturer of Chicago style hot dogs and other foods
 Vienna bread
 Vienna Development Method from theoretical computer science
 Vienna lager, a style of beer first brewed in Vienna in 1841
 Vienna Teng (born 1978), singer-songwriter
 Vienna sausage
 University of Vienna
 "Vienna", a poem by Stephen Spender
 A cat in Rising Damp
 A character in the 1954 film Johnny Guitar
 A computer virus that first appeared in 1987
 Vienna, the codename of a cancelled release of Windows

See also
 Wien (disambiguation)
 Vienne (disambiguation)
 Viennese (disambiguation)
 Vienna station (disambiguation)
 New Vienna (disambiguation)
 Siege of Vienna (disambiguation)
 Vienna summit, a 1961 conference between U.S. president Kennedy and Soviet premier Khrushchev
 Viena expedition, a 1918 Finnish military operation
 Viena Balen (born 1986), Croatian road cyclist